Isidor Straus (February 6, 1845 – April 15, 1912) was a Bavarian-born American Jewish businessman, politician and co-owner of Macy's department store with his brother Nathan. He also served for just over a year as a member of the United States House of Representatives. He died with his wife, Ida, in the sinking of the passenger ship RMS Titanic.

Early life
Straus was born into a Jewish family in Otterberg in the former Palatinate, then ruled by the Kingdom of Bavaria. He was the first of five children of Lazarus Straus (1809–1898) and his second wife and first cousin, Sara Straus (1823–1876). His siblings were Hermine (1846–1922), Nathan (1848–1931), Jakob Otto (1849–1851) and Oscar Solomon Straus (1850–1926). In 1854 he and his family immigrated to the United States, following his father, Lazarus, who immigrated two years before. They settled first in Columbus, Georgia, and then lived in Talbotton, Georgia, where their house still exists today. He was preparing to go to the United States Military Academy at West Point when the outbreak of the American Civil War prevented him from doing so. In 1861, he was elected an officer in a Confederate military unit but was not allowed to serve because of his youth; in 1863, he went to England to secure ships for blockade running. Straus worked as an aide to a London-based Confederate agent while living in England, as well as a Confederate bond salesman in both London and Amsterdam.

Career 
After the Civil War,  they moved to New York City, where Lazarus convinced Rowland Hussey Macy, founder of Macy's, to allow L. Straus & Sons to open a crockery department in the basement of his store.

Isidor Straus worked at L. Straus & Sons, which became the glass and china department at Macy's. In 1888, he and Nathan Straus became partners of Macy's. In 1893 he and his brother bought a controlling interest in Wechsler & Straus, renamed Abraham & Straus. By 1896, Isidor and his brother Nathan had gained full ownership of R. H. Macy & Co.

Marriage and children
In 1871, Isidor Straus married Rosalie Ida Blun (1849–1912). They were parents to seven children (one of whom died in infancy):
 Jesse Isidor Straus (1872–1936), who married Irma Nathan (1877–1970), and served as U.S. Ambassador to France, 1933–1936
 Clarence Elias Straus (1874–1876), who died in infancy
 Percy Selden Straus (1876–1944), who married Edith Abraham (1882–1957), daughter of Abraham Abraham
 Sara Straus (1878–1960), who married Dr. Alfred Fabian Hess (1875–1933)
 Minnie Straus (1880–1940), who married Dr. Richard Weil  (1876–1917)
 Herbert Nathan Straus (1881–1933), who married Therese Kuhn in 1907 (1884–1977)
 Vivian Straus (1886–1967) first married Herbert Adolph Scheftel (1875–1914) with whom she had two of her three children and second, in 1917, married George A. Dixon Jr. (1891–1956).

His great-great granddaughter is singer King Princess.

Political career 
He served as a U.S. Congressman from January 30, 1894, to March 3, 1895, as a Democratic representative of New York's 15th congressional district. He won a special election in January 1894 to complete the term of Ashbel P. Fitch, who had resigned to become New York City Comptroller. Straus did not run for re-election in the general election of November 1894. Also, Straus was president of The Educational Alliance and a prominent worker in charitable and educational movements, very much interested in civil service reform and the general extension of education. He declined the office of Postmaster General which was offered him by U.S. President Grover Cleveland.

When the newly formed Mutual Alliance Trust Company opened for business in New York on the Tuesday after June 29, 1902, there were 13 directors, including Emanuel Lehman, William Rockefeller, Cornelius Vanderbilt, and Straus.

Death on the Titanic

Traveling back from a winter in Europe, mostly spent at Cape Martin in southern France, Isidor and his wife were passengers on the RMS Titanic when, at about 11:40 p.m. on April 14, 1912, it hit an iceberg. Once it was clear the Titanic was sinking, Ida refused to leave Isidor and would not get into a lifeboat without him. According to friend and Titanic survivor Colonel Archibald Gracie IV, when he offered to ask an officer if Isidor could enter a lifeboat with Ida, Isidor refused to be made an exception while women and children were still on board, while Ida is reported to have said, "I will not be separated from my husband. As we have lived, so will we die, together." Ida gave her maid her fur coat and insisted she get into a lifeboat. Isidor and Ida were last seen on deck arm in arm; eyewitnesses described the scene as a "most remarkable exhibition of love and devotion". The ship sank at 2:20 am.

Isidor's body was recovered and taken to Halifax, Nova Scotia, and from there shipped to New York. He was first buried in the Straus-Kohns Mausoleum at Beth-El Cemetery in Brooklyn, and he was then moved to the Straus Mausoleum in Woodlawn Cemetery in the Bronx in 1928. Ida's body was never found, so the family collected water from the wreck site and placed it in an urn in the mausoleum. Isidor and Ida are memorialized on a cenotaph outside the mausoleum with a quote from the Song of Solomon (8:7): "Many waters cannot quench love—neither can the floods drown it."

Memorials

In addition to the cenotaph at Woodlawn Cemetery, there are three other memorials to Isidor and Ida Straus in their adopted home of New York City:

 A memorial plaque can be seen on the main floor of Macy's Department Store in Manhattan.
 The Isidor and Ida Straus Memorial is located in Straus Park, at the intersection of Broadway and West End Avenue at 106th Street (Duke Ellington Boulevard) in Manhattan. The park is one block from where they resided at 105th Street and West End Avenue (now the site of the Cleburne Building). An inscription reads, "Lovely and pleasant they were in their lives, and in death they were not divided." (2 Samuel 1:23)
 New York City Public School P.S. 198, built in Manhattan in 1959, is named in memory of Isidor and Ida Straus.  The building, at Third Avenue between East 95th and 96th Streets, shares space with another school, P.S. 77.
Straus Hall, one of Harvard's freshman residence halls in Harvard Yard, was given in honor of the Strauses by their three sons.

In popular culture
The couple are portrayed in the 1953 film Titanic, the 1958 film A Night to Remember, and in the musical Titanic, in scenes that are faithful to the accounts described above. In the 1997 film Titanic, the Strauses are briefly depicted kissing and holding each other on their bed as their stateroom floods with water, during a sequence of emotional events while the ship's string quartet plays the hymn "Nearer My God to Thee". A deleted scene shows Isidor (played by Lew Palter) attempting to persuade Ida (played by Elsa Raven) to enter a lifeboat, which she refuses to do.

See also
 List of German Americans
 6-15-99 Club
 List of Jewish members of the United States Congress

References

Further reading
Donald E. Wilkes Jr, Georgians Died on Titanic (1994)

External links
Encyclopedia Titanica Biography of Isidor Strauss
 
Straus article at JewishEncyclopedia.com
Straus Historical Society

1845 births
1912 deaths
Burials at Woodlawn Cemetery (Bronx, New York)
Deaths on the RMS Titanic
19th-century German Jews
German emigrants to the United States
Jewish members of the United States House of Representatives
Macy's
American businesspeople in retailing
People from Talbot County, Georgia
People of Georgia (U.S. state) in the American Civil War
Democratic Party members of the United States House of Representatives from New York (state)
19th-century American politicians
People from Kaiserslautern (district)
People from the Kingdom of Bavaria
Mutual Alliance Trust Company people
People from the Upper West Side
Straus family
19th-century American businesspeople
Jewish Confederates
People from Amsterdam
People from London